This is a list of mayors of Trimbach, Canton of Solothurn, Switzerland. The mayor of Trimbach (Gemeindepräsident von Trimbach) chairs the municipal council (Gemeinderat).

References

Trimbach
 
Politics of the canton of Solothurn
Lists of mayors (complete 1900-2013)